Atherton is a town in the Metropolitan Borough of Wigan, Greater Manchester, England.  The town and its suburbs of Howe Bridge and Hindsford contain 17 listed buildings that are recorded in the National Heritage List for England.  Of these, four are listed at Grade II*, the middle of the three grades, and the others are at Grade II, the lowest grade.

The area became a centre for making nails, and later bolts, and then for the cotton and coal industries.  The older listed buildings are houses, farmhouses, farm buildings, a chapel and associated structures, and an obelisk.  The listed buildings surviving from the industrial past are a bolt mill, a cotton mill, and terraces of miners' houses, and the other listed buildings are churches.


Key

Buildings

References

Citations

Sources

Lists of listed buildings in Greater Manchester
Listed